Horrible Science is a similar series of books to Horrible Histories, written by Nick Arnold (with the exception of Evolve or Die, which is written by Phil Gates), illustrated by Tony de Saulles and published in the UK and India by Scholastic. They are designed with the intention to get children interested in science by concentrating on the trivial, unusual, gory, or unpleasant. The books are in circulation in 24 countries, and over 4 million books have been sold in the UK alone.

Nick Arnold released a paper entitled "Teaching Science the Horrible Way", in which he demonstrates the reasons why the Horrible Science series has a positive contribution to learning. According to Arnold, Horrible Science books are based on everyday topics and key areas of the curriculum. The range of approaches used in Horrible Science books are intended to emphasise the drama and excitement and wonder of science. Science words and concepts are introduced gradually, often using humour or fact files. Although mathematics is not needed at the level of science covered in the books, some activities require calculators. The books contain experiments under the heading "Dare you discover...". Several of the books end with thoughts on how science will shape the future.

History
Before writing the series, Nick Arnold was at the University of North London working on an educational project. He explained to The Birmingham Post: "It was actually a lucky break or a well-placed letter – whichever you want to believe – Because I wrote this really cheeky letter to the publishers Scholastic saying that if they were looking for someone to write a horrible science book I was the one. And would you believe they actually let me write a science book and put lots of horrible bits in it – and then it was hugely successful”.

During the mid-2010s, Horrible Science was given a book makeover, altering the covers of some of their old books, and all of the new books being published to have a new, more colorful background and updated information.

A Horrible Science theatre show produced by the Birmingham Stage Company which, also brought Horrible Histories to the stage, was created in 2013.

Approach
Nick Arnold explained his approach towards writing the series in an interview with The Birmingham Post: "My approach to a subject is to vastly over-research it. I have become quite good at science by writing these books so have got quite a lot of knowledge already but then I really like finding out more information. If I over-research then I don’t just have all the facts I need, I have a lot more – and that means I can really choose what I want to include. The thing about a Horrible Science book is that actually it is all about imagination. The more you know the more you want to know and the more you want to develop that."

Critical reception
The response towards the series has been generally positive. Some reviews of the series website  included a The Independent review that "Really Rotten Experiments" is "Perfect for keeping the kids occupied on a rainy day, this is full of useful tips...and fun, naughty experiments". Another review by the Evening Express (Aberdeen) said that the book Horrible Science: Painful Poison is "With fantastic fact files, quirky quizzes, humorous cartoons and easy-to-understand text, it makes science pretty horrible, but great fun". Books For Keeps said of the book Deadly Diseases: "Gruesome gut churning contents, you need a strong stomach to tackle this, and certainly before eating". The Scotsman commented on the series as a whole, "Nick Arnold has a reputation as quite a showman and his Horrible Science series provides him with plenty of opportunity for stunts. Children emerge wide-eyed and inspired". A review at  described the series as "These are so much better than some of the dry textbooks that I used to have to read when I was in school...I'm saying that books like this are great for students because they show students that science is truly interesting and amazing!". A review by Roberta of the Growing with Science blog said of the book Chemical Chaos: "It is every bit as humorous (downright silly in spots) and as comprehensive as the history series was". She adds that the "[series as a whole] go a long way to fill that gap [between middle and high school students". As said of Evil Inventions in a review by
Jennifer Cameron-Smith at: "This is a delightful book and would make a wonderful present for any budding young scientist as well as a worthwhile addition to a school library. Making science fun can sometimes be a challenge, but books such as this certainly assist."

Controversy
There has been a negative response to Issue 6 - Hidden Horrors in the Home in the magazine adaption of the book series. The article named "Loony Lab" in this Horrible Science Collection had a section called "Grow your own manky microbes". A complainant, a biology teacher and parent, described it as "irresponsible in the extreme". A plastic petri dish and sachet of agar powder are provided as "free gifts", and children are encouraged to sample areas which may harbour disease-causing organisms (pathogens), such as a toilet handle, a dog's ear, or a "bogey". Under certain circumstances, contact with these substances is potentially life-threatening. The complainant added "The potential for real harm is jaw-dropping. Even in school, under supervision of trained staff, we would not be allowed to do much of what the article suggests, namely for health and safety reasons. How can they be sure that every child will follow even the meagre and woefully inadequate safety advice given?"

Awards and nominations
The Horrible Science series has received the following awards :
The ZSL Thomson Reuters Record Award for Communicating Science awarded to Nick Arnold and Tony De Saulles for Wasted World. Arnold said "For a science writer, the Thomson Reuters ZSL Award is the World Cup and I am honoured and thrilled to have won it."
Winner of the Junior Aventis Science Book Prize 2004 for Really Rotten Experiments
Winner of the Rhône-Poulenc Junior Science Book Prize 1997 for Blood Bones & Body Bits
Winner of the Rhône-Poulenc Junior Science Book Prize 1997 for Ugly Bugs
Winner of the Royal Society Prizes for Science Books 2004 awarded to Nick Arnold and Tony de Saulles for Really Rotten Experiments
Nominee of the Royal Society Prizes for Science Books 2003 awarded to Nick Arnold for The Terrible Truth About Time
Nominee of the Royal Society Prizes for Science Books 2001 awarded to Nick Arnold for Suffering Scientists
Winner of the Royal Society Prizes for Science Books 1997 awarded to Nick Arnold for Blood Bones and Body Bits and Ugly Bugs

Book categories

Original books
These are the original books in the core series:
 (Angry Animals) (2005) 
 Blood, Bones and Body Bits (1996) (Human body)
 Body Owner's Handbook (2002) (Human body)
 Bulging Brains (1999) (Brain)
 Chemical Chaos (1997) (Chemicals and Alchemy)
 Deadly Diseases (2000) (Diseases)
 Disgusting Digestion (1998) (Digestion)
 Evil Inventions (2007) (Inventions)
 Evolve or Die (1999) (Evolution)
 Fatal Forces (1997) (Forces and motion)
 The Fearsome Fight for Flight (2004) (The History of Flight)
 Frightening Light (1999) (Light)
 House of Horrors (2012) 
 How to Draw Horrible Science (2011)
 Killer Energy (2001) (Energy and thermodynamics)
 Measly Medicine (2006) (Medicine)
 Microscopic Monsters (2001) (The very small - Bacteria, germs and viruses)
 Nasty Nature (1997) (The animal kingdom depicted in nature and those who study it)
 Painful Poison (2004) (Poison)
 Shocking Electricity (2000) (Electricity, both artificial and in nature)
 Sick! From Measly Medicine to Savage Surgery (2009)
 Sounds Dreadful (1998) (Sound)
 Space, Stars and Slimy Aliens (2003) (Space)
 The Terrible Truth about Time (2002) (Time)
 Ugly Bugs (1996) (Insects and invertebrates)
 Vicious Veg (1998) (Plants)
 Wasted World (2009) (Global Warming)
 The Horrible Science of YOU   (2009) (Human Body)

Omnibus editions and boxed sets

There are several "Two in One" editions:
 Ugly Bugs and Nasty Nature
 Blood, Bones and Body Bits and Chemical Chaos
 Frightening Light and Sounds Dreadful
 Bulging Brains and Disgusting Digestion
 Microscopic Monsters and Deadly Diseases
 Killer Energy and Shocking Electricity
 Fatal Forces and The Fight for Flight

There have also been Three in One editions such as Ugly Bugs, Nasty Nature and Vicious Veg, a set of 10 books (Vicious Veg, Space, Stars, and Slimy Aliens, Ugly Bugs, Bulging Brains, Deadly Diseases, Chemical Chaos, Disgusting Digestion, Blood, Bones, and Body Bits, Nasty Nature, and Evil Inventions), and a set of 20 titled Bulging Box of Books.

Activity books

Shuffle puzzle books
 Angry Animals Shuffle Puzzle Book (2008)
 The Blood, Bones and Body Bits Shuffle Puzzle Book

Jigsaw books
 Dangerous Dinosaurs Jigsaw Book (2006) (Dinosaurs)
 The Seriously Squishy Jigsaw Book
 Ugly Bugs Jigsaw Book (2008)

Sticker-activity books
 Disgusting Digestion Sticker-Activity Book
 Ugly Bugs Sticker-Activity Book

Others
 The Seriously Squishy Quiz Book Pack
 The Awfully Big Quiz Book

It may be noted that the Sticker-Activity books have been renamed, along with their new design, by dropping the "Sticker" aspect and leaving "Activity".

Annuals
 Annual 2008
 Annual 2009
 Annual 2010
 Annual 2011
 Annual 2012 
 Annual 2013
 Annual 2014
 Annual 2015
 Annual 2016

Specials
There are a couple books in the Horrible Science series that have a special sign on the front cover that indicate their inclusion in the "Special" sub-series of Horrible Science:
 Explosive Experiments (2001) (Science Experiments)
 Suffering Scientists (2000)(Scientist)

Handbooks
Following suit with the other main Horrible series', Horrible Science has recently introduced a new range of books, known as Handbooks.
 Beastly Body Experiments
 Bulging Brain Experiment
 Freaky Food Experiments
 Famously Foul Experiments
 Sharks

Teachers resources
The Horrible Science Teachers Resources subseries is, as described by Nick Arnold: "a whole series of books full of expert tips and photocopiable resources designed for pupils aged 7–11". 
 Electricity
 The Human Body
 Forces
 Animals
 Sound
 Light
 Minibeasts
 Plants
 Micro-organisms
 Earth and Beyond

Others
These are the books that do not fit into the other categories. They are:
 The Awfully Big Quiz Book (2000) (Science)
 The Horrible Science of Everything (2005) (Science)
 Really Rotten Experiments (2003) (Science Experiments)
 The Seriously Squishy Science Book (2007 World Book Day Special)
 Smelly Science (Science)
 The Stunning Science of Everything (2005)
 How to Draw Horrible Science (2011)

Magazines

There is also a magazine collection to this series, which is collectively known as the Horrible Science Collection. This series was originally planned to encompass 60 issues, but due to their popularity, another 20 were added to the series.
The titles are as follows:
 Beastly Body Bits - (Human Body)
 Chemical Chaos - (Chemicals)
 The Smashing Solar System - (Solar System)
 Disgusting Digestion - (Digestive System)
 Shocking Electricity - (Electricity)
 Hidden Horrors In The Home - (Bacteria and Germs)
 Bulging Brains - (Brains)
 Savage Spiders & Slippery Slimeballs - (Spiders and Slugs)
 Rotten Reactions - (Chemical Reactions)
 Beastly Bloody Body Bits - (Human Body)
 Awful Earth - (Earth)
 Mad as Matter - (Matter)
 Painful Poisons - (Poisons)
 Bones 'n' Groans - (Bones)
 Insect Invaders - (Insects)
 Super Sleuth - (Spies Codes)
 Nasty Nature - (Nature)
 Fearsome Fuels - (Fossil Fuels)
 Deadly Diseases - (Diseases)
 Gruesome Gravity - (Gravity)
 Mean Machines - (Machines)
 Universe & Worse.... - (The Universe)
 Vicious Veg - (Plants)
 Body Owner's Manual - (Body Parts)
 Lethal Lightning - (Lightning)
 Mean Mammals - (Mammals)
 Mighty Magnetism - (Magnetism)
 Awesome Ants & Sleazy Bees - (Ants and Bees)
 Fatal Forces - (Forces)
 Crazy Cures & Revolting Remedies - (Cures)
 Barmy Birds - (Birds)
 Blast Off! - (Spacecraft)
 Evil Evolution - (Evolution)
 Horrible Heat - (Heat)
 Freaky Fish - (Fish)
 Startling Senses - (The 5 Senses: Sight, Smell, Taste, Touch and Hearing)
 Sounds Dreadful - (Sound)
 Sinister Swamps - Swamps)
 Ghastly Genes - (Genes)
 Microscopic Monsters - (Microorganisms)
 Growing Up Grossly - (Growth)
 Foul Frogs & Slimy Toads - (Frogs and Toads)
 Terrible Time - (Time)
 Frightening Light - (Light)
 Dangerous Dinosaurs - (Dinosaurs)
 More Painful Poisons - (Poisons)
 Fearsome Flight - (Flight)
 Foul Food - (Food)
 Staying Alive - (Survival)
 Fearsome Flying Machines - (Flying Machines)
 Revolting Reptiles - (Reptiles)
 Dead Freezing - (Cold)
 Noisy Nature - (The animal kingdom)
 Mad Medicine - (Medicine)
 Foul Fungi - (Fungi)
 More Dangerous Dinosaurs - (Dinosaurs)
 Blinding Light - (Light)
 Gruesome Germs - (Germs)
 Slimy Sea Monsters - (Sea creatures)
 It's About Time - (Time)
 Perilous Planes - (Planes)
 Big And Bad Beasts - (Dangerous Animals)
 Shady Spies - (Spies)
 Musical Mayhem - (Sounds and Music)
 Prehistoric Pests - (Prehistoric Life)
 Baffling Brainboxes - (Human Brain)
 Mind Boggling Materials - (Matter)
 Pesky Plants - (Plants)
 Wicked Weather - (Weather)
 Underwater Uglies - (Aquatic animals)
 Mean Body Machine - (The Human body)
 Rowdy Robots - (Robots)
 Gruesome Guzzling - (Eating and Digestion)
 Nuclear Nasties - (Nuclear power)
 Mind Magic - (Science of magic)
 Hairy Humans - (Evolution of humans)
 Freaky Future - (Futurology)
 Horrid Healthcare - (Health and Medicine)
 Awful Inventions - (Inventions, Technology)
 How to be a Suffering Scientist - (Scientists)

There have also been three 'special' magazines in the series:

S1. DIY Shocking Science - (Experiments)

S2. Spooky Science - (Hallowe'en and Monsters)

S3. Alien Science - (Aliens)

Flip charts
On 3 March, 2008, several online flip charts (aka Activlessons) were released by Promethean Planet. As the site explains, "these ready-made interactive whiteboard resources have instant child-appeal, making the teaching of the QCA Science units fun and effective". The titles included are:
 Animals and their Habitats
 The Human Body and Keeping Healthy
 Minibeasts
 Sounds
 Plants

TV series

In May, 2015, British television network CITV announced that filming had begun on a new ten-part TV series of Horrible Science. The series is produced by Toff Media, a company owned and founded by comedians Ben Miller and Alexander Armstrong, and co-owned by Hat Trick Productions.

The series stars Ben Miller, stand-up comedian Chris Martin, Tom Bell, Jason Forbes, Letty Butler, Susan Wokoma and Eleanor Lawrence. There will also be some guest appearances by other actors.

The series focuses on a science show and its crew that consist of the show's host Mark (Martin), a talking brain Professor McTaggart (Miller) (who hosts the segment called The Brain Dump), robot Bob (Bell), microscopic Professor Small (Lawrence) and her crew of scientists and the show's producer Lucy (Butler). Armstrong provides the voice of the unseen announcer Tannoy who tells the crew how long until the show starts. Each episode also features a famous scientist being interviewed by either Mark or McTaggart. In a similar vein to the TV adaptation of Horrible Histories, each episode also concludes with a song that serves as a parody of another popular song.

Episodes

Series 1
Series 1 began on 13 September 2015.

References

External links

 
 Horrible Science series by Nick Arnold at WorldCat
Horrible Books and Magazines USA

Book series introduced in 1996
Children's non-fiction books
Horrible Histories
Series of children's books
Series of non-fiction books
Science education in the United Kingdom